The  (LGM) or  is a French international school in Addis Ababa, Ethiopia. It was established in 1947 and ine the same year had integrated the Mission laïque française. It includes multilingual education in French, English and Amharic from preschool for all students. , the school has about 1,800 students, ranging from 3 to 18 years.

The French government spends around €4 million every year on LGM, which comes out to about €2,500 per student.

Namesake 
The school's name commemorates Dedjazmatch Guebre Mariam Gari (or, without his military title: Guebre Mariam Gari), who was an anti-fascist resistance fighter during the Second Italo-Abyssinian War in 1935, when Italy invade Abyssinia. His name, Guebre Mariam, literally means “servant of Mary”.

The hyphen in the school's name is due to a French punctuation convention. (See French orthography#Hyphens)

Alumni
 Helen Pankhurst
 Liya Kebede
 Ethiopian Records
 Amde Akalework
 Sahle-Work Zewde
 Chef Yohanis
 Betty G.
The LGM has a website dedicated to its alumni, former LGM students. Alumni website link

See also
 Agency for French Education Abroad
 Education in France
 International school
 List of international schools
 Mission laïque française
 Multilingualism

References

External links
 
 

Addis Ababa
International schools in Ethiopia
Schools in Addis Ababa
Trilingual schools
Cambridge schools in Ethiopia
Educational institutions established in 1947
1947 establishments in Ethiopia
AEFE contracted schools
Mission laïque française